Zsuzsanna Bekecs (born 17 May 1976) is a Hungarian biathlete. She competed at the 1998 Winter Olympics and the 2002 Winter Olympics.

References

1976 births
Living people
Biathletes at the 1998 Winter Olympics
Biathletes at the 2002 Winter Olympics
Hungarian female biathletes
Olympic biathletes of Hungary
Place of birth missing (living people)